Cybersoft, Inc. was an American video game publisher, which was a subsidiary of GameTek. It was designed to publish games for the Super Nintendo Entertainment System. The GameTek name would be used on Sega Genesis titles, in a similar structure to THQ, with Malibu Games, and Acclaim Entertainment with their LJN label.

Video games

Super NES
Adventures of Yogi Bear (1994)
Air Cavalry (1995)
Brutal: Paws of Fury (1994)
Carrier Aces (1995)
Full Throttle: All-American Racing (1995)
Spectre VR (1994)

References

External links

Defunct video game companies of the United States
Video game publishers